The Leyenda de Azul (Spanish for "the Blue Legend") is a lucha libre tournament held seven times by the Mexican professional wrestling promotion Consejo Mundial de Lucha Libre (CMLL) between 2000 and 2008 and again in 2011 and 2012. The tournament honors Blue Demon, or Demonio Azul as he's sometimes referred to. The tournament is not nearly as prestigious as CMLL's annual Leyenda de Plata tournament. The winner is given a plaque with a Blue Demon mask on it and a championship belt featuring Blue Demon as well. All tournaments have taken place in Arena México in Mexico City and all were held on Fridays during CMLL's Super Viernes show. In 2009 Blue Demon Jr. threatened to take legal action against CMLL on behalf of the National Wrestling Alliance over CMLL's use of three NWA branded championships. While CMLL did not publicly respond to the threat they dropped the tournament from their schedule for two years. In July 2011, CMLL, still not on good terms with Blue Demon Jr., announced the return of the tournament. The tournament would instead be endorsed by Blue Demon's biological son and Blue Demon Jr.'s adopted brother, El Hijo de Blue Demon.

Tournament winners

Leyenda de Azul 2000

The first Leyenda de Azul tournament took place on October 27, 2000, just 21 days after the 2000 version of the Leyenda de Plata tournament. 16 men competed in a Torneo cibernetico match for the trophy. Only the second half of the match was shown on television, which means that the order of the first eight eliminations is only known to the people in attendance at Arena México that night. The first eight are listed alphabetically. During the match Máscara Año 2000 allowed himself to get pinned by Shocker while he himself had Shocker pinned to ensure that Shocker was eliminated from the tournament. Blue Panther won the torneo cibernetico when he pinned Mr. Niebla.

Leyenda de Azul 2003

CMLL did not hold a Leyenda de Azul in 2001 or 2002 but did promote the tournament in 2003. Like the first Leyenda de Azul, the second version also centered around a 16-man Torneo cibernetico match. The match came down to Shocker and Tarzan Boy, at the time both mid-card wrestlers hoping to move into the main event picture. Tarzan Boy pinned Shocker to win the 2003 Leyenda de Azul trophy.

Leyenda de Azul 2004

The third Leyenda de Azul tournament took place on October 8, 2004, and like the two previous Leyenda de Azul tournaments featured a 16-man torneo cibernetico. The final two wrestlers in the match were Canek and Universo 2000. Universo 2000 pinned Canek to win the tournament, gaining a small measure of revenge on the man that beat him for his mask only three weeks prior at  the CMLL 71st Anniversary Show.

Leyenda de Azul 2005

The fourth Leyenda de Azul took place on July 15, 2005. Unlike previous years' tournaments CMLL did not use the torneo cibernetico format but instead opted for a 16-man, one night tournament to take place on the July 15, 2005 CMLL Super Viernes show. The winner of the tournament would also be considered the first CMLL World G1 Heavyweight Champion and win a place in New Japan Pro-Wrestling's (NJPW) upcoming G1 Climax tour in August, 2005. While it was never confirmed officially it is believed that NJPW actually decided who they wanted to tour with them and thus who won the tournament. The final match saw Lizmark Jr. pin Último Guerrero to earn both the Leyenda de Azul trophy and the CMLL World G1 Heavyweight Champion. The G1 championship was never referred to again after July 15, 2005, not even when Lizmark Jr. competed in NJPW.

Leyenda de Azul 2006

The 5th Leyenda de Azul took place on November 4, 2006, and was like the 2005 version a one night, 16-man single elimination tournament. CMLL used the same tournament format as the previous year as they had the winner of the first and the last match of the first round face off in the finals. The finals saw Rey Bucanero defeat Atlantis to win the trophy and belt.

Leyenda de Azul 2008

The sixth Leyenda de Azul took place on December 12, 2008, and was the focal point of CMLL's Friday night CMLL Super Viernes show. This tournament was the first Leyenda de Azul tournament to see the winner being crowned as a result of outside interference as Ephesto and El Texano Jr. helped El Terrible overcome Marco Corleone to win the tournament.

Leyenda de Azul 2011

On July 25, 2011, CMLL released a poster for an event, which revealed that after a two-year break, Leyenda de Azul would return on July 29. While CMLL was still on bad terms with Blue Demon Jr., the tournament was instead endorsed by his adopted brother and Blue Demon's biological son, El Hijo de Blue Demon, who also presented Mr. Niebla with the trophy after his win.

Leyenda de Azul 2012

The eighth Leyenda de Azul tournament took place on October 12, 2012, on CMLL's Super Viernes show. The match included 16 wrestlers in total and saw Diamante Azul win the tournament.

Leyenda de Azul 2014

After no Leyenda de Azul tournament in 2013 CMLL promoted the ninth version of the event on June 20, 2014, as the main event of their weekly Super Viernes ("Super Friday") show. The tournament format saw 16 men complete in a Torneo cibernetico elimination match. The finals of the match saw Atlantis eliminate long time rival Último Guerrero to win the tournament.

Leyenda de Azul 2014 Order of elimination

Leyenda de Azul 2016

The 2016 Leyenda de Azul (Spanish for "Blue Legend") was a one-night professional wrestling tournament, produced and scripted by the Mexican professional wrestling promotion Consejo Mundial de Lucha Libre (CMLL; Spanish for "World Wrestling Council") that was held on November 18, 2016 as part of their weekly Super Viernes show held at Arena México in Mexico City, Mexico. The 18-man torneo cibernetico elimination match was held in honor of Blue Demon, and was the tenth time CMLL held the Leyenda de Azul tournament.

The teams for the 16-man torneo cibernetico match were split by the rudo/tecnico ("bad guys"/"good guys") roles each wrestler portrayed with Team Tecnico consisting of Atlantis, Blue Panther, Marco Corleone, Diamante Azul, Máximo Sexy, Stuka Jr., and Valiente, while Team Rudo consisted of Euforia, Gran Guerrero, Hechicero, Kráneo, La Máscara, Rey Bucanero, El Terrible, and Último Guerrero. The match ended with Último Guerrero pinning Valiente to eliminate him and win the Leyenda de Plata for the first time.

Leyenda de Azul 2016 Order of elimination

Leyenda de Azul 2017

The 2017 Leyenda de Azul (Spanish for "Blue Legend") was a one-night professional wrestling tournament, produced and scripted by the Mexican professional wrestling promotion Consejo Mundial de Lucha Libre (CMLL; Spanish for "World Wrestling Council") that was held on December 22, 2017 as part of their weekly Super Viernes show held at Arena México in Mexico City, Mexico. The 18-man torneo cibernetico elimination match was held in honor of Blue Demon, and was the eleventh time CMLL held the Leyenda de Azul tournament.

The 2017 competitors first faced off in a battle royal to determine the teams for the main match. Team "A" consisted of Euforia, Forastero, Máscara Año 2000, Mr. Niebla, El Terrible, Rush, Vangellys and Sansón while Team "B" consisted of Último Guerrero, Shocker, Kráneo, Rey Bucanero, Gran Guerrero, Pierroth, Hechicero, and Misterioso Jr. In the end Rush won the tournament, lastly eliminating Euforia to win the event.

Leyenda de Azul 2017 Order of elimination

References

Consejo Mundial de Lucha Libre tournaments
Recurring events established in 2000
Events in Mexico City